Murray Hall may refer to:

People
 Murray Hall (politician) (1841–1901), New York City bail bondsman and Tammany Hall politician
 Murray Hall (ice hockey) (born 1940), retired professional ice hockey player
 Murray Hall (cyclist) (born 1953), Australian cyclist

Buildings
 Murray Masonic Hall, a building in Murray, Idaho
 Voorhees Mall (AKA Murray Hall), an academic building at Rutgers University

Hall, Murray
Architectural disambiguation pages